The following is a list of awards and nominations received by the Fox sketch comedy variety series The Tracey Ullman Show. The series received a total of 10 Primetime Emmy Awards, a Golden Globe, and others.

Awards and nominations

American Comedy Awards

GLAAD Media Awards

Golden Globe Awards

Primetime Emmy Awards

Young Artist Awards

References

External links
 Accolades received by The Tracey Ullman Show at the Internet Movie Database
 The Tracey Ullman Show at the Academy of Television Arts & Sciences web site
 The Tracey Ullman Show at the Golden Globe Awards web site

Tracey Ullman Show
Tracey Ullman